The Cardiochilinae are a subfamily of braconid parasitoid wasps. This subfamily has been treated as a tribe of Microgastrinae in the past. Some species including Toxoneuron nigriceps have been used in biocontrol programs.

Description and distribution 
Cardiochilines are non-cyclostome braconids with a similar appearance to Microgastrines. They possess the r-m vein of the forewing and have more than 16 flagellomeres.

Cardiochilines can be found worldwide.

Biology 
Cardiochilinae are solitary koinobiont endoparasitoids of caterpillars. Female Cardiochilinae inject a polydnavirus into the host during oviposition.

References

External links 
 Photos on BugGuide
 DNA barcodes at BOLD systems

Braconidae
Apocrita subfamilies